is a Japanese voice actress who works for Aoni Production.

Notable voice roles

Anime
Air Master (Yu Takigawa)
DearS (Harumi Ikuhara)
Detective Conan (Tenko Himemiya)
Green Green (Chigusa Iino)
Gunparade March (Sarasa Wichita)
Mythical Detective Loki Ragnarok (Urd)
Ragnarok The Animation (Zealotus)
Sentimental Journey (Honoka Sawatari)
Tenchi Muyo! GXP (Amane Kaunaq)
Xenosaga: The Animation (KOS-MOS)
Yumeria (Neito)
Boku no Pico (Pico)

Games
Atelier Iris: Eternal Mana (Zeldalia)
BS Tantei Club: Yuki ni Kieta Kako (Reiko Nomura)
Castlevania: Portrait of Ruin (Stella, Loretta)
Dead or Alive: Dimensions (Irene Lew)
Edelweiss (Mei Ibuki)
Green Green (Chigusa Iino)
Lifeline (Rio Hohenheim)
Meltylancer (Felnates Felie)
Mugen no Frontier: Super Robot Wars OG Saga (KOS-MOS, Cardia Basirissa, T-elos)
Mugen no Frontier EXCEED: Super Robot Wars OG Saga (KOS-MOS, Cardia Basirissa, T-elos)
Namco × Capcom (KOS-MOS, Waya-Hime)
Naval Ops: Warship Gunner (Professor Braun)
Ninja Gaiden II (Irene Lew)
Ninja Gaiden 3 (Irene Lew)
Project X Zone (KOS-MOS, T-elos, Neito)
Project X Zone 2 (KOS-MOS, T-elos)
Riviera: The Promised Land (Malice) (PSP version)
Rockman X: Command Mission (Marino)
Samurai Warriors (Nōhime)
Samurai Warriors 2 (Nōhime)
Samurai Warriors 3 (Nōhime)
Samurai Warriors 4 (Nōhime)
Sentimental Journey (Honoka Sawatari)
Super Robot Wars Original Generations (Echidna Iisaki)
Tales of the Abyss (Nephry Osborne, Gelda Nebilim)
Time Crisis 4 (Elizabeth Conway)
The King of Fighters EX2: Howling Blood (Jun Kagami)
Xenoblade Chronicles 2 (KOS-MOS Re:)
Xenosaga Episode I: Der Wille zur Macht (KOS-MOS)
Xenosaga Episode II: Jenseits von Gut und Böse (KOS-MOS)
Xenosaga Episode III: Also sprach Zarathustra (KOS-MOS, T-elos)
Yggdra Union: We'll Never Fight Alone (Zilva, Marietta, #367) (PSP version)
Yumeria (Neito)

References

External links

Mariko Suzuki at Ryu's Seiyuu Infos

Living people
People from Tokyo
Japanese video game actresses
Japanese voice actresses
Year of birth missing (living people)